Ogimachi may refer to:
Emperor Ōgimachi, the 106th Emperor of Japan
Ōgimachi Station (Osaka), a station of the Sakaisuji Line of Osaka Municipal Subway
Ōgimachi Station (Kanagawa), a station of the JR Tsurumi Line
Ogimachi Village, included in Historic Villages of Shirakawa-gō and Gokayama